Aspergillus brunneus is a species of fungus in the genus Aspergillus. It is from the Aspergillus section. The species was first described in 1893. It has been reported to produce asperflavin, asperentins, auroglaucin, bisanthrons, dihydroauroglaucin, echinulins, 5-farnesyl-5,7-dihydroxy-4-methylphthalide, erythroglaucin, flavoglaucin, isoechinulins, mycophenolic acid, neoechinulins, physcion, questin, tetracyclic, and tetrahydroauroglaucin.

Growth and morphology

A. brunneus has been cultivated on both Czapek yeast extract agar (CYA) plates and Malt Extract Agar Oxoid® (MEAOX) plates. The growth morphology of the colonies can be seen in the pictures below.

References 

brunneus
Fungi described in 1893